Peridroma chersotoides is a moth of the family Noctuidae. It was first described by Arthur Gardiner Butler in 1881. It is endemic to the Hawaiian island of Maui. It has also been recorded from the islands of Molokai and Hawaii, but these references may be in error.

Larvae possibly feed on pokeweed.

Taxonomy
There has been much confusion in the literature in reference to this species. In all the British Museum series, the only examples which can rightly be assigned to this species are the original pair taken by Thomas Blackburn.

External links

Noctuinae
Endemic moths of Hawaii
Moths described in 1881